The Aruban Olympic Committee was established in 1985 after Aruba separated from the Netherlands Antilles. Previously, Aruba was represented by the Netherlands Antilles Olympic Committee (NAOC). It received recognition the following year from the International Olympic Committee (IOC).

Olympic competitions 

Aruba first competed at the 1988 Summer Olympics and has participated in each Summer Olympic Games since then. Aruba has not competed in any Winter Olympic Games. Aruba has yet to win any Olympic medals.

References

External links
  

Aruba at the Olympics
National Olympic Committees
Sports governing bodies in Aruba
Sports organizations established in 1985
1985 establishments in the Netherlands